Milk and Honey is the sixth and final album by John Lennon and Yoko Ono, released in 1984, four years after Lennon’s murder. It is Lennon's eighth and final album, and the first posthumous release of new Lennon music, having been recorded in the last months of his life during and following the sessions for his 1980 album Double Fantasy. It was assembled by Yoko Ono in association with the Geffen label.

Background
Milk and Honey was the duo's projected follow-up to Double Fantasy, though Lennon's murder caused a temporary shelving of the project.  It took Ono three years to be able to resume work to complete it. Ono's material largely comprises new recordings which she undertook during the album's preparation in 1983, which give her songs a more commercial and contemporary edge. Conversely, Lennon's material, being rough takes and rehearsal recordings, has a more casual feeling.

Music and lyrics
"Nobody Told Me", a song Lennon intended for Ringo Starr's 1981 album Stop and Smell the Roses, was released as a single and became a worldwide Top 10 hit.  Other singles from the album were "I'm Stepping Out" and "Borrowed Time". The songs "Let Me Count the Ways" and "Grow Old with Me" were written by Lennon and Ono to each other using inspiration from poems by Elizabeth Barrett Browning and Robert Browning. They are presented in their demo form.

Ultimate Classic Rock critic Nick DeRiso called "I Don't Want to Face It" the most underrated song on Milk and Honey, describing it as being "complicated, just like Lennon, brutally frank and sort of tossed off, too".

Title
The album title came from Ono, who explained that it referred to their journey to the US, "the land of milk and honey". "But also, in the Scripture, the land of milk and honey is where you go after you die, as a promised land", Ono went on to say. "So it's very strange that I thought of that title. Almost scary – like someone up there told me to call the next album Milk and Honey". The cover is an alternate take from the same photo session that produced the front cover of Double Fantasy, though this photo appears in colour.

Release

After falling out with David Geffen, whose Geffen Records had initially released Double Fantasy, Ono moved future projects to Polydor Records, which initially released Milk and Honey. EMI, home of Lennon's entire recorded output—including that with the Beatles—acquired this and all Lennon releases in the late 1990s. Milk and Honey did not match the commercial success met by Double Fantasy in the wake of Lennon's death, but it was still well received, peaking at No. 3 in the UK and No. 11 in the US, where it went gold. Jack Douglas, who had co-produced Double Fantasy with Lennon and Ono, also had input into the initial sessions for Milk and Honey, though Ono declined to credit him after their professional relationship soured following Lennon's death.

Aftermath
In 2001, Ono supervised the remastering of Milk and Honey for its CD reissue, adding three bonus tracks and a 22-minute excerpt from Lennon's last interview in the late afternoon of 8 December 1980, 5 hours before his death.

The bonus tracks include home demo recordings of "I'm Stepping Out" and "I'm Moving On" (from Double Fantasy) along with a version of "Every Man Has a Woman Who Loves Him" featuring Lennon's vocals only, which was planned to be included on the Ono tribute album Every Man Has a Woman (released 1984).

Track listing
Side one
"I'm Stepping Out" (John Lennon) – 4:06
"Sleepless Night" (Yoko Ono) – 2:34
"I Don't Wanna Face It" (Lennon) – 3:22
"Don't Be Scared" (Ono) – 2:45
"Nobody Told Me" (Lennon) – 3:34
"O' Sanity" (Ono) – 1:05

Side two
"Borrowed Time" (Lennon) – 4:29
"Your Hands" (Ono) – 3:04
"(Forgive Me) My Little Flower Princess" (Lennon) – 2:28
"Let Me Count the Ways" (Ono) – 2:17
"Grow Old with Me" (Lennon) – 3:07
"You're the One" (Ono) – 3:56

Personnel

 John Lennon – guitar, keyboards, vocals, piano on "Grow Old with Me"
 Yoko Ono – vocals, piano on "Let Me Count the Ways"
 Chris Mawson – guitar
 Earl Slick – guitar
 Elliott Randall – guitar
 Steve Love – guitar
 Hugh McCracken – guitar
 Neil Jason – bass
 Tony Levin – bass
 Wayne Pedziwiatr – bass
 Howard Johnson – baritone saxophone
 Gordon Grody – backing vocals
 Billy Alessi – backing vocals
 Bobby Alessi – backing vocals
 Peter Cannarozzi – synthesizer
 Paul Griffin – piano
 George Small – piano
 Ed Walsh – keyboards
 Peter Thom – backing vocals
 Kurt Yahjian – backing vocals
 Carlos Alomar – backing vocals 
 Andy Newmark – drums
 Allan Schwartzberg – drums
 Yogi Horton – drums
 Arthur Jenkins – percussion
 Jimmy Maelen – percussion

Charts

Weekly charts

Year-end charts

Certifications and sales

References

External links

John Lennon albums
Yoko Ono albums
1984 albums
Parlophone albums
Capitol Records albums
Albums published posthumously
Albums produced by John Lennon
Albums produced by Yoko Ono